Double knot refers to a knot wound twice. See:

Double anchorman knot
Double coin knot
Double constrictor knot
Double fisherman's knot
Double overhand knot
Double torus knot
Double windsor
Karash double loop